Dino was a marque best known for mid-engined, rear-drive sports cars produced by Ferrari from 1957 to 1976. The marque came into existence in late 1956 with a front-engined Formula Two racer powered by a brand new Dino V6 engine. The name Dino was used for some models with engines smaller than 12 cylinders, it was an attempt by the company to offer a relatively low-cost sports car. The Ferrari name remained reserved for its premium V12 and flat-12 models until 1976, when "Dino" was retired in favour of full Ferrari branding.

History

The name Dino honors Ferrari founder Enzo Ferrari's late son, Alfredo "Dino" Ferrari, credited with designing the V6 engine used in the car. Along with engineer Vittorio Jano, Alfredo persuaded his father to produce a line of racing cars in the 1950s with V6 and V8 engines. The Dino script that adorns the badge and cylinder head covers was based on Alfredo's own signature. The Dino models used Ferrari naming convention of displacement and cylinder count with two digits for the size of the engine in decilitres and the third digit to represent the number of cylinders, i.e. 246 being a 2.4-litre, 6-cylinder and 308 being a 3.0-litre, 8-cylinder.

Single seaters

Dino 156 F2

The first race car to ever bear the Dino marque badge was the 1957 Dino 156 F2 single seater intended for the Formula 2 series. Powered by an all-new, front-mounted, 65° Dino V6 co-designed by Vittorio Jano and named in memory of Enzo Ferrari's late son, Alfredo "Dino" Ferrari.
The new V6 engine, first built and tested in 1956, had to adhere to 1.5 litre, Formula 2 regulations.

The fuel system consisted of three Weber 38DCN carburettors and used regular fuel. The valvetrain was of a twin overhead camshafts per bank type with two valves per cylinder and single spark plugs.

As per the naming convention, the 1.5-litre, 6-cylinder car was named 156 and made its debut at the Naples Grand Prix in 1957. The chassis was made of steel tubes with independent front suspension, a de Dion rear axle along with Houdaille shock absorbers. Only one example was produced: s/n 0011. Its drivers included Luigi Musso, Maurice Trintignant and Peter Collins.

Luigi Musso managed to score third place at the time of its debut at the Naples GP and Maurice Trintignant won the Coupe de Vitesse. After two second places at the Modena GP (in both heats) by Musso.

In 1960 the engine was updated with a lower V-degree (65º>60º), a shorter stroke: 73 x 58.8 mm, 1476.6 cc and a single overhead camshaft.

This racer gave birth to a whole generation of V6-powered, Ferrari-built cars.

Dino 166 F2

A change in Formula One rules for the 1966 season brought changes to Formula 2 as well. New homologation requirements meant that at least 500 production units of the same engine block were to be produced. Ferrari turned to Fiat to produce a more affordable sports car for this purpose. Fiat produced two models with the Dino engine in coupé and spider form under the name Fiat Dino. And so for the 1967 European Championship season Ferrari was able to field a new car, the Dino 166 F2 with a rear-mounted, longitudinal 65° Dino V6 engine. The car made its debut at the Racing Car Show in Turin in February 1967.

Specifications
The new powerplant had  of total capacity with a bore of 86 mm and a very short stroke at only 45.8 mm with a Heron type 3 valves head. A single 'split' overhead camshafts per bank actuated the valves per cylinder: two inlet directly by the camshaft and one exhaust through a rocker. In 1968, the cylinder measures changed to 79.5 x 53.5 mm with an 11:1 compression ratio.
Fuel feed was by Lucas indirect injection and ignition by Magneti Marelli transistorized twin-plugs, later changed to a single ignition.
The chassis was a semi-monocoque with all-independent suspension and disc brakes. Seven cars were built, of which three were later converted for the Tasman race series with engines enlarged to 2.4 litres.

Racing
The cars were raced by Ernesto Brambilla, Chris Amon, Andrea de Adamich and Derek Bell. Their first F2 wins were the 1968 Hockenheim race and later the GP Roma at Vallelunga.

Dino 246 Tasmania

For the 1968 season of Formula One, Ferrari had returned to the V12-engined cars. This created a need to pursue other racing venues for their already existing projects. The Tasman Series for cars up to 2500 cc was just that venue and the Dino 246 Tasmania was just such a car. Converted from the Dino 166 Formula 2 basis with the engine enlarged to 2.4 L to meet the requirements without overstretching the engine.

Specifications
Internal dimensions were identical to that of the 246 F1-66. At an 11.5:1 compression ratio, power output was a healthy  at 8900 rpm. Already standard on 65° Dino V6 twin overhead camshafts per bank, and a novelty: four valves per cylinder. The same as its predecessor, the chassis was a semi-monocoque with all-independent suspension and disc brakes.

Racing
Only three cars were made and raced with success between 1968 and 1971, mainly in hands of Chris Amon and Graeme Lawrence. The Tasman Series was particularly suited for the Dino Tasmania. Chris Amon won two races in the 1968 Tasman Series and dominated the 1969 edition by scoring four wins in New Zealand and Australian Grands Prix and won the Drivers' Championship. In 1969, Amon was aided by Derek Bell in the other Scuderia Veloce car with enough points for fourth place. For the 1970 Tasman Series the winning car was handed over to Graeme Lawrence who won only one race but with four other podium finishes still won the championship.

Sports racing cars

Dino 196 S

The first sports racing car under Dino marque was 2.0 L Dino V6-engined Dino 196 S. The first example, s/n 0740 made in 1958, had a 65° DOHC configuration, as found in its Formula Two predecessor and is sometimes referred to as 206 S. The other, s/n 0776 from 1959, had its engine redesigned as a 60° SOHC version. A possible third car was immediately upgraded to 3.0 L specification and never raced it its two-litre form. All early Dino sports cars actually had Ferrari badges on the front.

Specifications
Both used the same carburettor setup with three 42DCN Webers, resulting in the same  power output. The differing factors were the rpm range: 7200 for the DOHC, 7800 for the SOHC engine and a twin spark plug arrangement for the DOHC-variant. Both cars were created on a tubular chassis with independent front suspension and live rear axle. The first car received Scaglietti coachwork, but was soon rebodied by Fantuzzi, who also bodied the second car. Their style was reminiscent of a Ferrari 250 TR and was often referred to as a 'smaller Testa Rossa'.

Racing
The first Dino 196 S made its debut at the Goodwood Sussex Trophy driven to second place by Peter Collins. After being converted to SOHC form, it scored silver for the 1959 Le Mans Test and a single victory at Coppa Sant Ambroeus. The last race for this car was the 1959 Pontedecimo-Giovi hillclimb in which another second place was achieved before the car was dismantled at the factory. The other Dino had a much longer career. In 1959, driven by Ricardo Rodriguez it finished fourth and second in a couple of races at the Governor's Trophy, Nassau. The following year the car was entered in the Targa Florio and finished seventh overall.

Replicas
Numerous replicas had been made of this model. Approximately twelve examples based on a tubular chassis with handcrafted aluminium bodywork in Fantuzzi spider style. Cars were created either by anonymous builders or by Vincenzo Marciano, an Italian private constructor. Power came from 2.4 L four-cam V6 Fiat Dino road car engine mated to a 5-speed ZF transmission.

Dino 296 S

The second Dino-badged sports racing model was the 1958 Dino 296 S. Only a single example, s/n 0746, was made with a near 3-litre V6 engine. It had a 65° configuration with twin overhead camshafts per bank and two spark plugs per cylinder. Total capacity was  thanks to internal measurements of 85 x 87 mm. With three Weber 45DCN carburettors, power was an impressive  at 7600 rpm.

A tubular steel chassis with independent front suspension, de Dion rear axle and drum brakes was clothed with a spider Fantuzzi bodywork as seen on its siblings from the same period. The fuel tank had 177 litres capacity.

Its first outing was in England at Silverstone Circuit in May 1958, where Mike Hawthorn scored third place. After just a single race the car was converted into an experimental 250 Testa Rossa model and raced in June, the same year, at the 1000km Nürburgring, where Wolfgang von Trips and Olivier Gendebien finished third overall. The model was further raced by Ricardo Rodriguez in the Bahamas and United States.

Dino 246 S

For the 1960 season, Ferrari presented a new derivative of their V6-engined sports racing car, the Dino 246 S. Its engine was closely related to that found in the Ferrari 246 F1 but designed as a 60°, chain-driven, single overhead camshaft per bank variant. Only two examples were ever created, s/n 0778 and 0784, the latter known as the 'high tail' spider.

Specifications
Internal measurements of 85 x 71 mm and resulting capacity of 2.4 L were identical to the Formula One sibling. The engine used a single spark plug per cylinder served by a single coil. This would be the last Dino sports racing car with a front-mounted engine.

The chassis was constructed out of steel tubes with independent front suspension and a live axle at the rear. Bodies were designed and executed by Fantuzzi, both in the style previously seen on the Dino cars, but s/n 0784 was rebodied as a 'high tail' spider before 1961 12 Hours of Sebring race. Brakes were of a disc type all-round.

Racing
The Dino 246 S debuted in January 1960 at the 1000km Buenos Aires but failed to finish due to ignition problems. Its first success came when both cars were entered in the 1960 Targa Florio, finishing second and fourth overall and first and second in the 'Sports 3.0' class. Phil Hill and Wolfgang von Trips drove the car that finished second. Ludovico Scarfiotti, Willy Mairesse and Giulio Cabianca were in the other car. In 1960, s/n 0778 was recreated at the factory after a pit stop fire damage at the 1000km Nürburgring. Both cars continued their later careers in the United States. The 'high tail' spider driven by Jim Hall and George Constantine scored sixth place and won its 'Sports 2.5' class at the 1961 12 Hours of Sebring.

Sports prototypes

Ferrari SP series 

The Ferrari Dino SP was a series of Italian sports prototype racing cars produced by Ferrari from 1961 through 1962. This first series of Dino-engined sports prototypes included the 246 SP, 196 SP, 286 SP, 248 SP, and 268 SP; distinguished from each other by use of V6 and V8 engines in different displacements. All shared a similar body and chassis with a rear mid-engine layout, a first for a Ferrari sports car. Major racing accolades include the 1962 European Hill Climb Championship, two overall Targa Florio victories, in 1961 and 1962, and "1962 Coupe des Sports" title.

At first the SP-series used Vittorio Jano-designed, V6 Dino engines in both SOHC 60° and DOHC 65° forms. Later, Ferrari introduced a new SOHC 90° V8 engine designed by Carlo Chiti. All used dry sump lubrication and were mated to a 5-speed manual transmission.

After 1963, these Ferrari SP models were no longer used by Scuderia Ferrari and passed into the ownership of private individuals or independent racing teams. They were succeeded by the Dino 166 P in 1965.

Dino 166 P

The 1965 Dino 166 P was created by Ferrari to compete in endurance racing with categories up to 1600 cc or even 2000 cc. One chassis that raced, s/n 0834, sported brand new all-aluminium berlinetta bodywork inspired by the Ferrari P-series of cars but with smaller dimensions. It was designed and built by Piero Drogo's Carrozzeria Sports Cars in Modena. This new style would be carried over to the rest of the Dino race car family. This was the first Ferrari-made sports prototype to bear the rectangular 'Dino' badge on the front of the car and also the first to be bodied with a closed body. A second car, s/n 0842, never raced and was converted into the works prototype of the Dino 206 S.

Specifications
From this moment on, every Dino race and road car would have a 65°, twin overhead camshafts per bank with two valves per cylinder engine. As a race engine it also used dry sump lubrication.

A tubular steel chassis now received full independent suspension, front and rear. Disc brakes all-round were standard at the time. The whole car weighed only  dry.

Racing
After a failed attempt at the 1000km Monza in May 1965, the following month the 166 P was entered into the GP Roma on the Vallelunga track. Giancarlo Baghetti won it outright, two laps ahead of a Porsche. The same month Lorenzo Bandini with Nino Vaccarella scored a respectable fourth place overall and second in 'Prototype 2.0' class at the 1000km Nürburgring, ahead of cars with much bigger engine capacity. Just after failing to finish the 1965 24 Hours of Le Mans race due to engine problems, the 166 P was developed into the Dino 206 SP with completely open bodywork and a bigger 2.0 L engine.

Dino 206 SP

The Dino sports prototype model that followed the 166 P was the Dino 206 SP. The first example was an exact conversion from is predecessor, still with the same s/n 0834, but with new barchetta body and a bigger 2.0 L engine. Designed specifically for the European hillclimb events, the car is also referred to simply as the Dino 206 P. A second car, s/n 0840, was the basis for the concept car, Dino Berlinetta Speciale by Pininfarina.

Specifications
The biggest change was the engine enlargement to 2.0 L so that car could make full use of the 2000 cc category limit. The engine was redesigned by Ferrari engineer Franco Rocchi for Formula Two use. This displacement would be carried over not only to the 206 S, the succeeding model, but also to the Fiat and Dino road cars as well.

All of the chassis and suspension configuration was carried over without change. Only a small, wrap-around windscreen and a single roll bar protruded above the bodywork. All this was with twisty hillclimb competition in mind. Later the car was rebodied in style with the 206 S and received similar roll bar-roof treatment.

Racing
The new car debuted at its first hillclimb in Trento-Bondone in 1965, winning it outright in the hands of Ludovico Scarfiotti, despite being described as "an absurdly dramatic climb". He also won three more races in a row: the Cesana-Sestriere hillclimb, the Freiburg-Schauinsland hillclimb and Ollon-Villars. At the Gaisberg hilllclimb in August 1965 Scarfiotti finished fifth but still won the European Hill Climb Championship. This was his second championship for Ferrari, the first he won back in 1962 in a Ferrari 196 SP. In 1967 the 206 SP was lent to Scuderia Nettuno that entered the car in the Targa Florio, placing fourth overall and third in the 'Prototype 2.0' class, driven by Vittorio Venturi and Jonathan Williams. Venturi then placed third in yet another hillclimb event at Monte Erice. Leandro "Cinno" Terra entered the 206 SP for the 1969 Targa Florio, but finished in a distant 25th place. Its last period race was the Coppa Collina, where it finished in second place.

Dino 206 S

The last of the Dino prototype sports car models was produced in 1966–1967. 18 examples were made with Group 4 category homologation in mind. Still powered by 2.0 L engine based on the 206 SP powerplant. Some received experimental 3-valve heads and Lucas fuel injection.

Concept cars
Ferrari built and presented numerous design concepts and prototypes to overcame styling and engineering challenges derived from a new engine layout of a road-car. As many as six different Dino prototypes were built between 1965-1967. The new and revolutionary design would spawn whole generations of Dino and Ferrari mid-engine road cars.

Dino Berlinetta Speciale
The first Dino-badged concept car was presented by Ferrari and Pininfarina in 1965. It was a mid-engined, two-seater called Dino Berlinetta Speciale. The work started in March 1965. The car was designed by Aldo Brovarone who created the conceptual plans that would in the future form a basic characteristics of the  production Dino cars. The project was managed by Leonardo Fioravanti, and its directors included Sergio Pininfarina.  They were all involved in creating and packaging this concept car and ultimately the production version, Dino 206 GT, that would also be partially credited to Fioravanti as its co-designer along Brovarone. Also in 1965, Brovarone designed the Alfa Romeo Giulia 1600 Sport concept car using the similar stylistic cues but realised on a front-engined car.

The Berlinetta Speciale was built on a competition Type 585 tubular chassis, derived from the Dino 206 SP sports prototype, with its engine mounted longitudinally. This first Dino concept car was finished in record time by October 1965, just before the 52nd Paris Motor Show. It was built on a spare chassis s/n 0840, from Scuderia Ferrari. In November of the same year, it was  exhibited at the Turin Motor Show and at the New York Motor Show in April 1966.

The short-wheelbase car had a very streamlined body with prominent wheel arches. The front of the car was very low and incorporated headlights covered with plexiglass. The elongated side air-intakes that channelled air for rear brakes cooling became a signature element of the marque range. The rear window was curved round the inclined rear pillars and were also part of the quarter-light windows. Whole rear section of the car could be opened to reveal an engine bay and spare wheel. The car and the cockpit were finished in Ferrari red and the non-adjustable seats in cream colour. The pedal box could be moved to conform to the driver. Same as on a competition car, the steering wheel was mounted on the right.

The Dino Berlinetta Speciale was sold on Artcurial auction in 2017 for €4,390,400.

Ferrari 365 P Berlinetta Speciale

The Ferrari 365 P Berlinetta Speciale is both seen as a scaled up version of the original Dino and its predecessor, presented at the same time as the other Dino prototypes, in 1966. The Ferrari Berlinetta Speciale was also known as "Tre-Posti" for its unique seating design. Aldo Brovarone of Pininfarina was also credited with this design, but the car featured a triple seating with the driver situated in the center. Also the overall size was larger to accommodate bigger V12 powerplant.

Dino Berlinetta GT
In 1966, Pininfarina designed an evolution over the previous concept car, the Dino Berlinetta GT prototype. It was presented in November 1966, at the 48th Turin Motor Show and previewed the production Dino road car that would be presented a year later at the same venue.

The prototype had three round taillights mounted on a chrome background and turn signals below the front grille. The reason was that the 2.0-liter V6 was mounted longitudinally in the middle of the car. The engine however was no longer a competition unit, rather a road-car sourced Type 135B. The same as before, the engine was accessed by a large lid hinged on the roof of the car that incorporated the buttresses and rear convex window. The side air intakes were elongated, featuring chrome bars that also functioned as door handles. The chassis was also different from the previous concept, now a Type 599. The chassis number 00106 was assigned in 1967 from the road car sequence.

The yellow-painted Dino Berlinetta GT prototype was sold in 2018 at Gooding & Company auction for US$3,080,000.

Dino Berlinetta Competizione

At the 1967 Frankfurt Motor Show, Pininfarina and Ferrari unveiled the Dino Berlinetta Competizione. It was a concept car designed by a young designer, Paolo Martin. It was an exclusive design study as well as a working prototype but was never intended to enter production. The concept was based on a Dino 206 S racing chassis s/n 034, one of the last of the series. The engine was a Type 231/B with an improved 3-valve heads.

Some of the design cues were influenced by the existing Dino competition cars. The whole creative process took no longer than four months. The overall rounded shape was later modified with addition of the front and rear spoilers. The gullwing doors featured a curved glass that would slide into the door structure.

Road cars

The Dino road cars marque was created to market a lower priced, more affordable sports car capable of taking on the Porsche 911. Ferrari's expensive V12s well exceeded the 911 in both performance and price. Enzo Ferrari did not want to diminish his exclusive brand with a cheaper car, so the Dino was created. 

Although a mid-engine layout was common in the world of sports car racing at the time, adapting it to a production car was quite daring. Such a design placed more of the car's weight over the driven wheels, and allowed for a streamlined nose, but led to a cramped passenger compartment and more challenging handling. Lamborghini created a stir in 1966 with its mid-engined Miura, but Enzo Ferrari felt a mid-engine Ferrari would be unsafe in the hands of his customers. Eventually he partially relented and a mid-engined Dino concept car was built for the 1965 Paris Motor Show. Response to the radically styled car was positive, so Ferrari allowed it to go into production, rationalizing the lower power of the V6 engine would result in a more manageable car.

Dino 206 GT

The first road-going Dino was the 1967 Dino 206 GT, designed by Aldo Brovarone at Pininfarina.

The 206 GT frame featured an aluminium body, full independent suspension, and all round disc brakes.
152 were built in total between 1967-1969, in left hand drive only.

Dino 246 GT and GTS

In 1969 the 206 GT was superseded by the more powerful Dino 246 GT. The 246 GT was powered by an enlarged  V6 engine, producing  at 7,600 rpm in European specification. Initially available as a fixed-top GT coupé, a targa topped GTS was also offered after 1971.

Other notable changes from the 206 were the body, now made of steel instead of aluminium, and a  longer wheelbase than the 206. Three series of the Dino 246 GT were built, with differences in wheels, windshield wiper coverage, and engine ventilation. Dino 246 production numbered 2,295 GTs and 1,274 GTSs, for a total production run of 3,569.

Dino 308/208 GT4

The 308 GT4 was produced from 1973 to April 1980. Initially branded "Dino", the 308 GT4 was Ferrari's first V-8 production automobile.

The 308 was designed by Bertone; with its angular wedge shape, it looked quite different from the 206/246 from which it was derived.

Fuel was fed by four Weber 40DCNF carburettors which produced  at 7700 rpm. The V-8 block and heads were made of an aluminium alloy. The compression ratio was 8.8:1. The American version had a timing change and catalytic converters; it produced a modest . For the  208 GT4, an Italian market model, manufacturer claimed . The GT4 weighed  dry.

The 308 GT4 wore the Dino badge until May 1976, when it finally got the Ferrari "Prancing Horse" badge on the hood, wheels, and the steering wheel.

References

Bibliography

External links

Dino Register
Club Dino Italia Ferrari, Fiat, Lancia Stratos
Dino UK Ferrari, Fiat, Lancia Stratos
Dino 156 F2: Ferrari History
Dino 196 S: Ferrari History
Dino 246 S: Ferrari History
Dino 206 SP: Ferrari History
Dino 166 F2: Ferrari History
Dino 246 Tasmania: Ferrari History

Ferrari
24 Hours of Le Mans race cars